"Blasphemy" is the fifth full-length studio release from New York death metal stalwarts Incantation, released in 2002.  It is dedicated to the memory of drummer Kyle Severn's brother, Chad (reading: "This recording is dedicated to the Memory of Chad Severn (1972-2001). I will miss you, brother.")

Track listing
All Music by John McEntee & Kyle Severn.  All Lyrics as noted.

Note that, many copies of the CD have the outro divided into two parts: part 1 is 23:00 exactly, while part 2 is 3:06.

Personnel
Mike Saez: Session Vocals
John McEntee: Guitars
Joe Lombard: Bass
Kyle Severn: Drums, Percussion

Production
Arranged by Incantation
Produced by Incantation and Bill Korecky
Recorded & Mixed by Bill Korekcy at Mars Recording Compound; mixed in January 2002

References

Incantation (band) albums
Candlelight Records albums
2002 albums